Chen Dong may refer to:
 Chen Dong (Song Dynasty) (1086–1127), Chinese scholar
 Chen Dong (general) (born 1956), deputy commander of the Chinese air force
 Chen Dong (astronaut) (born 1978), Chinese astronaut who flew on the Shenzhou 11 and Shenzhou 14 missions
 Chen Dong (footballer) (born 1978), Chinese footballer
 Michelle Bai (born 1978), born Chen Dong, Chinese actress